The Men's 50 metre backstroke competition of the 2022 FINA World Swimming Championships (25 m) was held on 15 and 16 December 2022.

Records
Prior to the competition, the existing world and championship records were as follows.

Results

Heats
The heats were started on 15 December at 11:19.

Semifinals
The semifinals were started on 15 December at 19:59.

Swim-off 
The swim-off was held on 16 December at 12:55.

Final
The final was held on 16 December at 21:11.

References

Men's 50 metre backstroke